Sclerophrys garmani, also known as Garman's toad or eastern olive toad (among others), is a species of toad in the family Bufonidae. It is widely distributed in East and Southern Africa. However, populations north and south of Tanzania might represent distinct species. If so, the name Sclerophrys garmani would apply to populations from northeastern Africa. Furthermore, its southern boundary towards the range of Sclerophrys poweri in South Africa is also unclear.

Etymology
The specific name garmani honors Samuel Garman, an American ichthyologist and herpetologist.

Description
The tympanum is almost as big as the eye diameter. The parotoid glands are large. The back is tan to olive-brown and bears large paired markings edged with black. A thin vertebral stripe may be present. Dorsal skin has distinct warts that bear small, black spines. The ventrum is off-white.

The male advertisement call is a loud, low-pitched "kwaak", lasting for about a second.

Range
The range extends from Ethiopia and Somalia southward through Kenya, Tanzania, Mozambique, Zambia, Zimbabwe, Botswana, to South Africa and Eswatini and west to Namibia and Angola.

Habitat
Sclerophrys garmani in habits both arid and wooded savannas as well as agricultural areas at elevations below . A Tanzanian population was found entirely in woodland areas. Breeding takes place in temporary water, sometimes also in artificial pools and rivers.

Sclerophrys garmani is common in parts of its range. It can be threatened by habitat loss caused by human expansion, settlement, and agricultural encroachment. However, it is an adaptable species that is not seriously at risk. It is present in many protected areas.

References

garmani
Frogs of Africa
Amphibians of Angola
Amphibians of Botswana
Amphibians of Eswatini
Amphibians of Ethiopia
Amphibians of Kenya
Amphibians of Mozambique
Amphibians of Namibia
Amphibians of Somalia
Amphibians of South Africa
Amphibians of Tanzania
Amphibians of Zambia
Amphibians of Zimbabwe
Taxa named by Seth Eugene Meek
Amphibians described in 1897
Taxonomy articles created by Polbot